20 All-Time Greatest Hits! is a compilation album by James Brown containing 20 of his most famous recordings. Released by Polydor in 1991 as a single-disc alternative to the Star Time box set, it features songs from the 1950s, 1960s, and 1970s. 16 of the songs from the album had previously topped the US R&B charts. The album itself peaked at number 99 on the R&B/Hip-Hop Albums chart after its release. In 2003, it was ranked number 414 on Rolling Stone magazine's list of the 500 greatest albums of all time.

Track listing

Personnel 
Credits for 20 All-Time Greatest Hits! adapted from Allmusic.
 John Bobbit – composer
 Deanna Brown – composer
 Deidra Brown – composer
 James Brown – composer, vocals
 James Razor Brown – producer
 Yamma Brown – composer
 Alfred Ellis – composer
 Pee Wee Ellis – composer
 D. Jenkins – composer
 David Lindup – composer
 Mims, Joe – composer
 Lowman Pauling – composer
 Fred Wesley – composer
 Isabelle Wong – design

Charts

Weekly charts

Certifications

References

1991 greatest hits albums
James Brown compilation albums
Polydor Records compilation albums